Red Oak is a town in Latimer County, Oklahoma, United States. The population was 549 at the 2010 census.

Eight miles northeast of the present town is the original site of Red Oak. There in 1850 Thomas Edwards established a trading post on the Fort Smith–Boggy Depot Road. With the advent of the Butterfield Overland Mail and stage line in 1858, Edwards's already prosperous store became a stopping place for mail and passengers. In March 1868 the store became an official post office, with Edwards as postmaster. He named the post office Red Oak, probably because there were trees near the store. The official designation was Red Oak, Skullyville County, Choctaw Nation. Edwards's Store has been listed in the National Register of Historic Places (NR 72001069).
The present location of "new" Red Oak, southwest of Edwards's, served as a stage stop between Fort Smith and Texas from the 1860s. For several years there was a sawmill, a lumberyard, and a mill where the business section was located at the turn of the twenty-first century. In 1888 the Choctaw Coal and Railway (later the Chicago, Rock Island and Pacific Railway) surveyed a route across present Latimer County, linking Wister to McAlester. With the advent of the railroad a town started to grow. Around 1890 Edwards's Store closed, and the "old" Red Oak post office officially moved to the new community.

Utilities
Telephone and Internet Services is provided by Hilliary Communications.

Geography
Red Oak is located at  (34.951669, -95.080890).

History 
The area around Red Oak has been inhabited since approximately 9,000 BCE, beginning with people of the Fourche Maline Culture who were descended from the first Native Americans to migrate from Asia via the Bering Land Bridge.  Archaeological sites such as the McCutchan-McLaughlin site in southeastern Latimer County provide evidence of Fourche Maline settlements, particularly the burial mounds used by these people groups.  The combination of poor health and prolonged drought led to the extinction of the Fourche Maline cultures by the early 15th century.  European explorers, including Francisco Vasquez de Coronado and Jean Baptiste Bernard de la Harpe, began arriving in the mid-16th century and found only scattered remains of these once thriving cultures.

Red Oak became an area of settlement for members of the Choctaw tribe during relocation as part of the Trail of Tears beginning in the 1830s.  In 1858, English immigrant Thomas Edwards married Choctaw native Nancy Hardaway and together they established a store on Hardaway's land on the Butterfield Overland Mail Route.  Adhering to Choctaw tradition in naming sites after people or prominent features, the community that arose around their store became known as "Red Oak," after a large red oak tree in the area.  Edwards' Store became the first post office in Red Oak and was a successful store for both the stage route and the growing community.  At the time it was founded, Red Oak was located in the Moshulatubbee District of the Choctaw Nation.

The arrival of the Choctaw Coal and Railway line (later the Rock Island and Pacific Railway) nine miles southwest of Edwards' Store led to the relocation of the town to its present site.  With close proximity to the railroad, Red Oak became a thriving and prosperous community in the early 20th century.  Some of the business structures from this era are still in existence, including the Red Oak Library (formerly the post office) and buildings lining the Main Street business district (such as Rustic Customs, Eagle Ridge Camp Store, and Fields Hardware).

The earliest schools were located in homes prior to 1900, with the first high school built in 1909.  In 1921, Red Oak High School relocated from a brick building on the south side of town to a native sandstone building on the far north end of town.  The two-story, pentagonal building is listed on the Oklahoma Historic Register and was followed in 1938 by a new elementary school (now Alice Savage Elementary) built by workers of the Works Progress Administration.  The building was also constructed of native sandstone and consisted of nine classrooms and an auditorium/gymnasium.  This building was replaced in 1950 with the current high school building (W.B. Rutledge High School).  All three buildings are still in use and were renovated in the early 21st century through a series of bond issues.

Education
Red Oak has one elementary, junior high, and one high school.  Total enrollment in the 2018–2019 academic year was 314 students, an increase of almost 75 percent in the past decade.  The high school was named one of America's Best High Schools in 2017 by U.S. News & World Report.  The school is a one-to-one technology school and boasts programs in STEM, technology, 4-H, FCCLA, FFA, and art.  KIBOIS also operates a Head Start program in Red Oak.

The high school athletic teams are renowned for their recent state championships:  softball teams have won 14 state championships, baseball teams have won 11 championships, and boys' basketball teams have won three state championships.  Other activities sanctioned by the Oklahoma Secondary Schools Activities Association include cross country and academic team.  The archery team, affiliated with the OKNASP program, has won two state championships.

Demographics

As of the census of 2000, there were 581 people, 239 households, and 155 families residing in the town. There were 283 housing units at an average density of 301.4 per square mile (116.2/km2). The racial makeup of the town was 70.57% White, 0.52% African American, 21.86% Native American, and 7.06% from two or more races. Hispanic or Latino of any race were 0.69% of the population.

There were 239 households, out of which 27.2% had children under the age of 18 living with them, 45.6% were married couples living together, 13.8% had a female householder with no husband present, and 35.1% were non-families. 32.6% of all households were made up of individuals, and 20.9% had someone living alone who was 65 years of age or older. The average household size was 2.43 and the average family size was 3.06.

In the town, the population was spread out, with 27.2% under the age of 18, 8.4% from 18 to 24, 23.9% from 25 to 44, 20.8% from 45 to 64, and 19.6% who were 65 years of age or older. The median age was 38 years. For every 100 females, there were 91.7 males. For every 100 females age 18 and over, there were 88.0 males.

The median income for a household in the town was $20,461, and the median income for a family was $25,625. Males had a median income of $27,188 versus $21,250 for females. The per capita income for the town was $11,270. About 22.8% of families and 25.5% of the population were below the poverty line, including 37.9% of those under age 18 and 15.1% of those age 65 or over.

Notable people
Lane Adams, Major League baseball player

Troy Walker, former professor at Eastern Oklahoma State College

References

Towns in Oklahoma
Towns in Latimer County, Oklahoma